The four species of avocets  are a genus, Recurvirostra, of waders in the same avian family as the stilts. The common name is thought to derive from the Italian (Ferrarese) word . Francis Willughby in 1678 noted it as the "Avosetta of the Italians".

Biology
Avocets have long legs and they sweep their long, thin, upcurved bills from side to side when feeding in the brackish or saline wetlands they prefer. Their plumage is pied, sometimes also with some red.

Members of this genus have webbed feet and readily swim. Their diet consists of aquatic insects and other small creatures.

They nest on the ground in loose colonies. In estuarine settings, they may feed on exposed bay muds or mudflats.

The pied avocet is the emblem of the Royal Society for the Protection of Birds.

Taxonomy
The genus Recurvirostra was introduced in 1758 by Swedish naturalist Carl Linnaeus in the 10th edition of his  to contain a single species, the pied avocet, Recurvirostra avosetta. The genus name combines the Latin  meaning 'bent' or 'curved backwards' with  meaning 'bill'.

Species
The genus contains four species.

One fossil species, R. sanctaneboulae Mourer-Chauviré, 1978, dates from the late Eocene of France.

Range and habitat
In a large colony, they are aggressively defensive and chase off any other species of birds that try to nest among or near them. That causes the annoyed remark "Avocet: Exocet from some British birdwatchers.

They had been extirpated in Britain for a long time because of land reclamation of their habitat and persecution by skin and egg collectors, but during or soon after World War II, they started breeding on reclaimed land near the Wash, which was returned to salt marsh to make difficulties for any landing German invaders. Avocets use Titchfield Haven National Nature Reserve as a summer breeding ground.

References

External links

 

Recurvirostra
Wading birds